Peter Leslie Marshall (born 28 July 1955 in Sydney, Australia), is a former international rugby union referee.

He officiated in over 30 test matches and retired after the 2003 Rugby World Cup to take up the position of referees' manager at Rugby Australia.

References

1955 births
Living people
Sportspeople from Sydney
Australian rugby union referees